Asanga also known as Nung Ikot Asanga is a town located in the Nung Ikot Clan, Oruk Anam local government area of Akwa Ibom State, the southern region of Nigeria.

Nung Ikot Asanga also called Asanga Town is among the Annang ethnical group of Akwa Ibom State.
The town is subdivided into five villages: Ataessien, Ikot Enuah, Ikot Akpanang, Ikot Oboho and Ikot Eweh.

It shares some common boundaries with Ikot Okoro, Ntak Ibesit, Obiakpa. Others include Ikot Afanga, and Nung Ikot Obiodo.

Nearby cities 
 Abak in the north
 Ukanafun in the west
 Mkpat Enin/Etinan in the east
 Rivers State in the southern part of the town

Churches

References 

Populated places in Akwa Ibom State
Towns in Oruk Anam